Okonma  is an Igbo surname meaning "good man". Notable people with the surname include:

Antonia Okonma (born 1984), Nigerian-British actress
Tyler Okonma (born 1991), Nigerian-American rapper, stage name "Tyler, the Creator"

See also
Goodman (surname)

Igbo names